William Hiester may refer to:

William Hiester (Pennsylvania politician) (1790–1853), Pennsylvania congressman
William Muhlenberg Hiester (1818–1878), Pennsylvania military and political leader